Glycerol ester of wood rosin (or gum rosin), also known as glyceryl abietate or ester gum, is an oil-soluble food additive (E number E445). The food-grade material is used in foods, beverages, and cosmetics to keep oils in suspension in water, and its name may be shortened in the ingredient list as glycerol ester of rosin. It is also used as an ingredient in the production of chewing gum and ice cream. 

To make the glycerol ester of wood rosin, refined wood rosin is reacted with glycerin to produce the glycerol ester.

Glycerol ester of wood rosin is an alternative to brominated vegetable oil in citrus oil-flavored soft drinks. In some cases, both ingredients are used together.

References

External links
Standard Terminology Relating to Pine Chemicals, Including Tall Oil and Related Products

Resins
Food additives
Adhesives
E-number additives